Greathouse is an English surname. Notable people with the surname include:

Clarence Ridgley Greathouse (1846–1899), American lawyer, journalist and diplomat
Daniel Greathouse (c.1752 – 1775), American pioneer
Ed Greathouse (1899–1954), American boxer
Shiloh Greathouse, American skateboarder
William M. Greathouse (1919–2011), American Nazarene minister and theologian

English-language surnames